A1 Team Ireland was the Irish team of A1 Grand Prix, an international racing series. The team were the A1 Grand Prix champions for the fourth season, 2008-09.

The team 
Founded by Mark Kershaw and Mark Gallagher in 2005, the team was owned and run by Status Grand Prix. In 2008, Mark Kershaw sold his interest in the team. The new the seat holders were Mark Gallagher, Teddy Yip Jr., John P. Hynes and David Kennedy.

History 
The inaugural team's 2005-06 car was presented to the public on 15 September 2005. For that debut season, Ralph Firman was the team's principal driver, scoring the team its first podium in Portugal to finish 8th overall in the championship. The series organisers awarded the team for being the best presented team, the first of three consecutive wins for A1 Team Ireland.

In its second season, the team did not perform quite as well. The best result achieved that season was fifth place in the Feature race at Shanghai, and the team finished in a disappointing 19th place.

For the 2007–08 season, Ralph Firman secured some points at the season opener in Zandvoort before Adam Carroll took over as the A1 Team Ireland principal driver. He went on to get four podium finishes in his debut season and record the team's first Feature Race victory in Mexico City. After winning Ireland's Dunlop Racing Driver of the Year, Niall Quinn joined the team as the Rookie Driver. A1 Team Ireland ended Season Three in 6th position, helping them to win the 'Most Improved Team' award at the 2007/08 Gala Awards. A1 Team Ireland have won the A1GP award for best presented team in all three seasons alongside winning the 'Most Appealing Livery' trophy for their stunning green car in Season Two.

In the 2008–09 season, Adam Carroll returned as lead driver, as the team set its sights on a full championship assault. As rookie driver, Niall Quinn provided the engineers with important feedback, and getting each race weekend off to a flying start. A1 Team Ireland were championship contenders most of the season, and won the championship at the last event of the season at Brands Hatch, with a dominant performance.

Drivers

Complete A1 Grand Prix results 
(key), "spr" indicates the Sprint Race, "fea" indicates the Feature Race.

Notes

External links 
 a1teamireland.com Official A1 Team Ireland website
 edenrocksports.com Eden Rock Sports official website
 a1gp.com Official A1 Grand Prix Web Site

Ireland A1 team
National sports teams of Ireland
Irish auto racing teams
Auto racing teams established in 2005
Auto racing teams disestablished in 2009